Almas (also Romanized as Ālmās and Almās; also known as Almāsī and Almaz) is a village in Guney-ye Gharbi Rural District, Tasuj District, Shabestar County, East Azerbaijan Province, Iran. At the 2006 census, its population was 326, in 108 families.

References 

Populated places in Shabestar County